Aristobulus II  (Aristóboulos) was the Jewish High Priest and King of Judea, 66 BCE to 63 BCE, from the Hasmonean dynasty.

Family
Aristobulus was the younger son of Alexander Jannaeus, King and High Priest, and Salome Alexandra. After the death of Alexander in 76 BCE, his widow succeeded to the rule of Judea and installed her elder son Hyrcanus II as High Priest in 73 BCE. When Salome died in 67 BCE, Hyrcanus succeeded to the kingship as well.

Aristobulus shared his late father's views on religion and politics. He entertained designs upon the throne, even during the life of his mother. He courted the nobles and military party by constituting himself the patron of the Sadducees and bringing their cause before the queen. The many fortresses which the queen placed at the disposal of the Sadducees, ostensibly for their defense against the Pharisees, constituted in reality one of the preparatory moves of Aristobulus for the usurpation of the government. The queen sought to direct his military zeal outside Judea, and sent him (70-69) against Ptolemy Mennaeus; but when the undertaking failed, Aristobulus resumed his political intrigues. He left Jerusalem secretly and betook himself to his friends, who controlled the largest number of fortified places, with the intention of making war against his aged mother. But the queen died at the critical moment, and he immediately turned his weapons against his brother Hyrcanus, the legitimate heir to the throne.

Rebellion
Hyrcanus seemed to be sympathetic to the Sadducees just like his father Alexander Jannaeus. Aristobulus rebelled against his elder brother. Because of this conflict, the Pharisees seemed to be in a vulnerable position at this time.

Hyrcanus advanced against Aristobulus at the head of his mercenaries and his followers. The brothers met in battle near Jericho and many of Hyrcanus' soldiers went over to Aristobulus, and thereby gave the latter the victory.

Hyrcanus took refuge in the citadel of Jerusalem; but the capture of the Temple by Aristobulus compelled Hyrcanus to surrender. A peace was then concluded, according to the terms of which Hyrcanus was to renounce the throne and the office of high priest, but was to enjoy the revenues of the latter office.

This agreement however did not last, as Antipater the Idumaean convinced Hyrcanus that Aristobulus was planning his death and to take refuge with Aretas III, King of the Nabataeans. The Nabataeans advanced toward Jerusalem with an army of 50,000 and besieged the city for several months.

Roman intervention

During this civil war, the Roman general Pompey defeated the Kingdoms of Pontus and the Seleucids. He sent his deputy Marcus Aemilius Scaurus to take possession of Seleucid Syria.

As the Hasmoneans were allies of the Romans, both brothers appealed to Scaurus, each endeavoring by gifts and promises to win him over to his side. Scaurus, moved by a gift of 400 talents, decided in favor of Aristobulus and ordered Aretas to withdraw his army. During his retreat, the Nabateans suffered a crushing defeat at the hands of Aristobulus.

When Pompey arrived in Syria in 63 BCE, both brothers and a third party that desired the removal of the entire dynasty, sent their delegates to Pompey, who however delayed the decision. He favoured Hyrcanus II over Aristobulus II, deeming the elder, weaker brother a more reliable ally of the Roman Empire.

Pompey defeated the Jewish armies in multiple battles, and took the fortresses of Judea. Aristobulus and his sons Alexander and Antigonus were captured in 63 BCE. Aristobulos, suspicious of Pompey, entrenched himself in the fortress of Alexandrium, but when the Romans defeated his army again, he surrendered and undertook to deliver Jerusalem over to them. However, since many of his followers were unwilling to open the gates, the Romans besieged and captured the city by force, badly damaging city and temple. Hyrcanus was restored as High Priest, but deprived of political authority.

Aristobulus II escaped in 57 BCE, instigating rebellion against Rome in Judea, until he was finally holed up by Aulus Gabinius, consul of the Roman province of Syria, in Machaerus. Marc Antony, commander of the cavalry under Gabinius, led several men to scale Aristobulus' fortifications and subdue his forces.

Taken prisoner, Aristobulus was released by Julius Caesar in 49 BCE in order to turn Judea against Pompey. He was on his way to Judaea with his son Alexander, when "he was taken off by poison given him by those of Pompey's party". His son Alexander was beheaded by the Roman commander Scipio at Antioch.

His son Antigonus led a rebellion against Rome, with help from the Parthians, and became king and high priest in 40 BCE, but was defeated and killed by the Romans in 37 BCE.

See also
Hasmonean coinage
Siege of Jerusalem (disambiguation), list of sieges for, and battles of, Jerusalem

References

49 BC deaths
1st-century BC Hasmonean monarchs
1st-century BC murdered monarchs
1st-century BCE High Priests of Israel
Assassinated religious leaders
Deaths by poisoning
Year of birth unknown